Vladimír Maška (born 6 February 1973 in Děčín) is a male hammer thrower from the Czech Republic. His personal best throw is 81.28 metres, achieved in May 1999 in Pacov.

He finished twelfth at the 1999 World Championships in Seville and eighth at the 2000 Olympic Games in Sydney.

Achievements

External links

1973 births
Living people
Czech male hammer throwers
Czechoslovak male hammer throwers
Athletes (track and field) at the 2000 Summer Olympics
Athletes (track and field) at the 2004 Summer Olympics
Olympic athletes of the Czech Republic
People from Děčín
Sportspeople from the Ústí nad Labem Region